The 2020 Western Premier League was the 20th season of the Western Premier League (WPL), the top football league in the Central West region of New South Wales. It was the first season of the competition since 2012. Dubbo Bulls were the three-time defending champions, having won the past three competitions in 2010, 2011 and 2012.

The season kicked-off with three games on 11 July, with the Parkes Cobras-Orana Spurs match at Woodward Park in Parkes the first to get underway, marking the first WPL match in eight years. The season concluded with the grand final on 26 September. Dubbo Bulls claimed a fourth WPL title after defeating local rivals Macquarie United in the grand final 2–1 at Apex Oval.

Background and season summary 

The previous iteration of the Western Premier League had originally folded at the end of 2012 season when Dubbo Westside and Dubbo Bulls FC all pulled out in quick succession, leaving just three teams in the competition. Talks continued towards the end of 2019 and in the early months of 2020 about reviving the competition before the competition's return was officially announced by Western NSW Football in February.

Nine teams originally nominated for the competition - former champions Dubbo Bulls and Orange Waratahs, as well as Barnstoneworth United, Lithgow Workmen's, Macquarie United (Dubbo), Orana Spurs, Panorama, the newly-formed Parkes Cobras and South Dubbo Wanderers. However, due to the COVID-19 pandemic, Waratahs and Wanderers withdraw from the competition before a ball was kicked. With two teams withdrawing and with restrictions in place by Football NSW and the NSW Government, the competition could not kick-off in April, as originally planned, and restrictions threatened to cancel the WPL's return. But as restrictions were lifted, the WPL got the green light to return in July and it kicked-off on the fourth of that month with three matches on the same day.

The first round of matches saw Parkes Cobras (a team formed specially for the WPL) host Orana Spurs at Woodward Oval, Macquarie United were away in Orange to face Barnstoneworth United and Dubbo Bulls would face Panorama at Lady Cutler Oval. Lithgow Workmen's had the bye. The Parkes-Orana match kicked-off at 3pm, 15 minutes before the game in Orange and an hour before the Bulls-Panorama match, meaning Cobras' 17th minute opener by Daniel Clarke was the first WPL goal in eight years. All matches in the opening round ended in 1-all stalemates.

The first wins of the 2020 WPL season came in the second round when Barnstoneworth United overcome Panorama 4–2 in Bathurst, Dubbo Bulls won 4–1 away at Parkes Cobras, and Lithgow Workmen's defeated Macquarie United 2–1.
 
At the halfway mark in the season, Macquarie United surprised many by leading the competition by two points over Lithgow Workmen's and Dubbo Bulls, in second and third respectively. The Paul Crain-coached Macquarie side had a team featuring a number of teenagers, carried over from its Dubbo and District Football Association A grade campaign from 2019. Many expected the youthful side to finish last, however, Macquarie would eventually finish the regular season in first place, claiming the Premiers' Plate, one point ahead of city rivals Dubbo Bulls in second. 

In a fiery grand final, Dubbo Bulls claimed the title with a 2–1 winner over city rivals Macquarie United at Apex Oval.

Teams

Home venues and locations

Personal and kits

Regular season

Ladder

Results

Finals series

Semi finals

Grand final

Player stats

Top goal scorers

Hat-tricks

References 

2020 in Australian soccer